Hughes Bolckow formerly Messrs, Hughes, Bolckow, and Co., Limited was a well-known shipbreaking company based in Blyth, Northumberland.

Background

Intending to create an industrial park for dismantling obsolete warships in 1911, the company leased  of land from Lord Ridley and the Blyth Harbour Commissioners.

The company was responsible for scrapping a number of famous Royal Navy ships including HMS Britannia (previously HMS Prince of Wales). Their first ship was the former Certified Industrial Training Ship, HMS Southampton, which was sent to Blyth in June 1912 to be broken up. In response to requests from customers, the company created a series of "choice Antiques" from the fine old seasoned timber they possessed from Britannia. The company even had a Ship Timber Department that would create articles manufactured from teakwood taken from obsolete battleships and preserved in "Solignum."

During World War I, Messrs, Hughes, Bolckow, and Co. Limited experimented with employing women in jobs that were traditionally reserved for men.

In 1921, the company acquired four huge concrete hangars at the Marske-by-the-Sea Aerodrome in North Yorkshire. The hangars also had an attached  of land that the company announced would be used to store and to dispose of material purchased by the company from dumps in France.

Over the course of its existence the company bought up a number of other companies such as the Worth, Mackenzie ft Company, Limited, which was purchased in 1935. By 1952 it had become a subsidiary of Metal Industries, Limited and was listed on their books. In 1960 The Hughes Bolchow Shipbreaking Co., Ltd., of Blyth changed its name to Hughes Bolckow Ltd. so as to serve notice that, although its main activity was still shipbreaking, the company was branching out.

They also scrapped locomotives en masse during the 1960s, one locomotive purchased from this area being NER Class T2 (BR Class Q6) No. 63395, which has been preserved.

See also

 Blyth Shipbuilding Company
 Bolckow, Vaughan

Bibliography 
Notes

References 

 - Total pages: 241 

Defunct shipbuilding companies of the United Kingdom
Ship breaking
Companies based in Northumberland
Blyth, Northumberland